Familial progressive hyperpigmentation is characterized by patches of hyperpigmentation, present at birth, which increase in size and number with age. This is a genetic disease, however the gene that accounts for this spotty darkening of the skin has yet to be discovered. Although rare, the congenital disease is most prevalent among populations originating from China.

See also
Skin lesion

References

The American Journal of Human Genetics 84, 672–677, May 15, 2009

External links 

Disturbances of human pigmentation